Gordonia is a 2010 documentary film directed and produced by New Zealand filmmaker Tom Reilly.

Filmed over the course of seven years Gordonia follows the struggle between west Auckland landowner Graham Gordon and the former Waitakere City Council over Gordon's car wrecking business and illegal dwellings. As well as Gordon's story, the film traces the lives of several tenants living on his property, some of whom have mental health problems and claim to have nowhere else to live.

Persons featured 
 Graham Gordon
 Randal Wilson
 Shane Campbell
 Jeanae Gordon
 Brodie Andrews
 James Harvey
 Mervin Hellyer
 Martin Lush
 Billy TK Senior
 Bob Harvey (mayor)

Release 
Gordonia premiered at the 2010 New Zealand International Film Festival and was released in cinemas in Auckland and Wellington that same year.

References

External links 

 Gordonia webpage
New Zealand International Film Festival
Review in the NZ Herald

New Zealand documentary films
2010 films
2010 documentary films